Gephyromantis is a frog genus in the mantellid subfamily Mantellinae. This genus is restricted to Madagascar. At present it contains 45 species divided into six subgenera.

Taxonomy
The genus Gephyromantis was erected by Methuen in 1920 for the species Gephyromantis boulengeri. Blommers-Schlösser considered this group as a subgenus of Mantidactylus, but it was re-elevated to genus-level in 2006.

Species
This genus is divided into six subgenera:
 Gephyromantis Methuen, 1920
 Gephyromantis blanci Guibé, 1974
 Gephyromantis boulengeri Methuen, 1920
 Gephyromantis verrucosus Angel, 1930
 Gephyromantis leucocephalus Angel, 1930
 Gephyromantis decaryi Angel, 1930
 Gephyromantis hintelmannae Wollenberg, Glaw, and Vences, 2012
 Gephyromantis enki (Glaw and Vences, 2002)
 Gephyromantis eiselti Guibé, 1975
 Gephyromantis thelenae (Glaw and Vences, 1994)
 Gephyromantis mafy Vieites, Wollenberg, and Vences, 2012
 Gephyromantis runewsweeki Vences and De la Riva, 2007
 Gephyromantis klemmeri Guibé, 1974
 Vatomantis Glaw & Vences, 2006
 Gephyromantis silvanus (Vences, Glaw, and Andreone, 1997)
 Gephyromantis rivicola (Vences, Glaw, and Andreone, 1997)
 Gephyromantis webbi (Grandison, 1953)
 Gephyromantis lomorina Scherz, Hawlitschek, Razafindraibe, Megson, Ratsoavina, Rakotoarison, Bletz, Glaw & Vences, 2018
 Laurentomantis Dubois, 1980
 Gephyromantis ventrimaculatus (Angel, 1935)
 Gephyromantis malagasius (Methuen and Hewitt, 1913)
 Gephyromantis striatus (Vences, Glaw, Andreone, Jesu, and Schimmenti, 2002)
 Gephyromantis horridus (Boettger, 1880)
 Gephyromantis ranjomavo Glaw and Vences, 2011
 Phylacomantis Glaw & Vences, 1994
 Gephyromantis corvus (Glaw and Vences, 1994)
 Gephyromantis pseudoasper (Guibé, 1974)
 Gephyromantis azzurrae Mercurio and Andreone, 2007
 Gephyromantis atsingy Crottini, Glaw, Casiraghi, Jenkins, Mercurio, Randrianantoandro, Randrianirina, and Andreone, 2011
 Duboimantis Glaw & Vences, 2006
 Gephyromantis luteus (Methuen and Hewitt, 1913)
 Gephyromantis sculpturatus (Ahl, 1929)
 Gephyromantis plicifer (Boulenger, 1882)
 Gephyromantis salegy (Andreone, Aprea, Vences, and Odierna, 2003)
 Gephyromantis tandroka (Glaw and Vences, 2001)
 Gephyromantis moseri (Glaw and Vences, 2002)
 Gephyromantis schilfi (Glaw and Vences, 2000)
 Gephyromantis tohatra Scherz, Razafindraibe, Rakotoarison, Dixit, Bletz, Glaw and Vences, 2017 
 Gephyromantis tschenki (Glaw and Vences, 2001)
 Gephyromantis cornutus (Glaw and Vences, 1992)
 Gephyromantis redimitus (Boulenger, 1889)
 Gephyromantis granulatus (Boettger, 1881)
 Gephyromantis zavona (Vences, Andreone, Glaw, and Randrianirina, 2003)
 Gephyromantis leucomaculatus (Guibé, 1975)
 Gephyromantis saturnini Scherz, Rakotoarison, Ratsoavina, Hawlitschek, Vences & Glaw, 2018
 Gephyromantis grosjeani Scherz, Rakotoarison, Ratsoavina, Hawlitschek, Vences & Glaw, 2018
 Asperomantis Vences, Köhler, Pabijan, Bletz, Gehring, Hawlitschek, Rakotoarison, Ratsoavina, Andreone, Crottini & Glaw, 2017
 Gephyromantis asper (Boulenger, 1882)
 Gephyromantis spiniferus (Blommers-Schlösser and Blanc, 1991)
 Gephyromantis ambohitra (Vences and Glaw, 2001)
 Gephyromantis tahotra Glaw, Köhler, and Vences, 2011
 Gephyromantis ceratophrys (Ahl, 1929)
 Gephyromantis angano Scherz, Vences, Borrell, Ball, Nomenjanahary, Parker, Rakotondratsima, Razafimandimby, Starnes, Rabearivony and Glaw, 2017

References

 
Amphibians of Madagascar
Endemic fauna of Madagascar
Amphibian genera
Taxa named by Paul Ayshford Methuen